Alexander Akerman (October 9, 1869 – August 21, 1948) was a United States district judge of the United States District Court for the Southern District of Florida.

Education and career

Akerman was born on October 9, 1869 in Elberton, Georgia. His father was the noted lawyer Amos T. Akerman. He read law in 1892 and entered private practice in Cartersville, Georgia the same year. In 1898, Akerman was a Referee in Bankruptcy (a position created by the Bankruptcy Act of 1898, and the predecessor of modern bankruptcy judges) for the United States District Court for the Southern District of Georgia. Akerman was an Assistant United States Attorney for the Southern District of Georgia from 1901 to 1912 and was the United States Attorney for the Southern District of Georgia from 1912 to 1914. In 1914, Akerman relocated to Florida. He was in private practice in Kissimmee, Florida from 1914 to 1920. In 1920, Akerman moved to Orlando, Florida and formed, with John Moses Cheney, a new law firm. Today the firm is known as Akerman LLP and is one of the largest firms in Florida.

Federal judicial service

President Calvin Coolidge nominated Akerman to the United States District Court for the Southern District of Florida on January 19, 1929, to a new seat created by 45 Stat. 1081. Confirmed by the Senate on February 15, 1929, he received commission the same day. Akerman assumed senior status on October 8, 1939. He remained on the court until his death on August 21, 1948.

References

Sources
 

1869 births
1948 deaths
People from Elberton, Georgia
Florida lawyers
Georgia (U.S. state) lawyers
Judges of the United States District Court for the Southern District of Florida
United States district court judges appointed by Calvin Coolidge
20th-century American judges
United States Attorneys for the Southern District of Georgia
American law firm executives
People from Cartersville, Georgia
United States federal judges admitted to the practice of law by reading law
Assistant United States Attorneys